Carl Hoefkens (born 6 October 1978) is a Belgian former professional footballer who played as a defender. He was most recently the head coach of Belgian Pro League club Club Brugge.

Club career

Early career
Born in Lier, Belgium, Hoefkens started his career at K. Lierse S.K. and played there for six years. He made his breakthrough with Lierse in first class and won the Belgian Cup in 1999, beating Standard Liège in the final with 3–1. Afterwards, he made a move to Lommel but his move turned into a nightmare, when Lommel went broke in 2003. In the summer of 2003, he came to Germinal Beerschot, the first class team of the Belgian city of Antwerp. There, he became one of the pillars of the team. In his second season at Germinal Beerschot, he won the cup in the final against FC Bruges, then champions of Belgium. Hoefkens is still appreciated by Beerschot fans; a group of fans from the club have travelled to England on numerous occasions to watch him play.

Stoke City
In the summer of 2005 Stoke City manager, Johan Boskamp snapped him up for an undisclosed fee. He made his debut for the club in a 0–0 draw against Sheffield Wednesday on 6 August 2005. Hoefkens became an ever-present in the Stoke line-up and wore the number 2 shirt.

Hoefkens received acclaim for his performances in his first season in English football. He became a fans favourite at Stoke and was crowned 'Fans' Player of the year (2005–06). He then won his 9th cap for his country against Kazakhstan (0–0).

During the January 2007 transfer window he was linked with a return to Belgium, with Club Brugge reportedly interested in him. He was also penalty taker for Stoke before the arrival of Danny Higginbotham, however he still maintained a 100% record for the club. Hoefkens impressed both manager and fans alike with his technical ability during the 2006–07 season. He was also praised for his versatility, as he operated as a winger or a central midfielder on occasions in the latter stages of the season.

It was feared that Hoefkens had broken a bone in his foot in a Euro 2008 qualifier against Portugal however a scan revealed that there was no damage.

West Bromwich Albion
Stoke accepted a bid for Hoefkens from West Bromwich Albion on 4 August 2007. He joined Albion on 7 August 2007 in a £750,000 deal and was offered a two-year contract plus a further one-year as an option. Hoefkens made his Albion debut in a 2–1 defeat away at Burnley on the opening day of the 2007–08 season. One week later, Hoefkens was named in the Championship Team of the Week, following his performance in the 2–0 home win over Preston North End. He is known by his West Brom teammates as "Wolverine", due to his resemblance to the comic book hero from the X-Men.

Hoefkens was released in the summer of 2009.

Return to Belgium
On 25 August 2009 Club Brugge signed the former West Bromwich Albion's Belgian right-back on a two-year deal. He became captain in the season 2010–11. After the season ended, he signed for an extra year with the club. After 4 years and 127 appearances for the club, Hoefkens moved to Lierse in 2013, spending a season there before a move to Oostende.

Gibraltar
In August 2015, after his release from Oostende, Hoefkens signed for Gibraltar Premier Division side Manchester 62, who beat off competition from reigning champions Lincoln Red Imps for his signature. He signed undisclosed semi-professional terms for the side and will aid in the development of David Ochello's young side, making his debut on 26 September in a 1–0 victory over Glacis United.

International career
Hoefkens played twice for the Belgium national team scoring once. He also represented Belgium in the 1997 FIFA World Youth Championship.

Coaching and later career
At the end of January 2018, Hoefkens was hired as a scout for Knokke.

On 28 May 2018, it was confirmed, that Hoefkens would return to Club Brugge from the upcoming season as a beloftencoach/talentcoach, where he would function as assistant coach and talent coach for the U21 and U18 teams. In June 2019, Hoefkens was placed in a new role as a part of the first team staff, where he would have the specific task of guiding young talents and provide the link between the academy and the first team. In May 2022, Hoefkens took over as head coach of Club Brugge, signing a contract with indefinite duration. In the 2022–23 UEFA Champions League, he led Club Brugge to the knockout phase for the first time in the Champions League era. On 28 December 2022, Club Brugge announced the termination of his contract.

Personal life
Hoefkens is married and has two sons: Milan and Valentino. Hoefkens can speak Dutch, English, French, German and Italian.

Career statistics

Club

International

Score and result list Belgium's goal tally first, score column indicates score after Hoefkens goal.

Manager

Honours

Player 
Lierse
 Belgian First Division A: 1996–97
 Belgian Cup: 1998–99
 Belgian Super Cup: 1997, 1999

Beerschot A.C. 
 Belgian Cup: 2004–05

West Bromwich Albion 
 Football League Championship: 2007–08

Individual
 Stoke City F.C. Player of the Year: 2006

Manager 
Club Brugge
 Belgian Super Cup: 2022

References

External links

 
 Belgium Stats at Belgian FA
 

1978 births
Living people
People from Lier, Belgium
Association football defenders
Belgian footballers
Belgium youth international footballers
Belgium under-21 international footballers
Belgium international footballers
Belgian expatriate footballers
Belgian expatriate sportspeople in England
Expatriate footballers in England
Lierse S.K. players
Beerschot A.C. players
K.V.C. Westerlo players
Club Brugge KV players
Stoke City F.C. players
West Bromwich Albion F.C. players
K.V. Oostende players
Manchester 62 F.C. players
Belgian Pro League players
Premier League players
English Football League players
K.F.C. Lommel S.K. players
Club Brugge KV head coaches
Expatriate footballers in Gibraltar
Belgian expatriate sportspeople in Gibraltar
Footballers from Antwerp Province